The Ukrainian Women's Handball Super League is the top women's league of Ukrainian handball.

History
The league was founded in 1992. It is run by the Handball Federation of Ukraine (FHU). Before, the Ukrainian teams played in the championship of the USSR. During the seasons from 1991–92 till 1999–2000 it was called the Supreme League. During the seasons from 2000–01 till 2003–04 it was called the Supreme League A. It is named Super League since the 2004–05 season.

Between leagues at the end of each season, the teams exchanged – the worst drop in the lower-ranking division, their places are taken by the best team of the lower leagues. The best teams of the Super League play in European Cup tournaments held under the auspices of the European Handball Federation (EHF).

Winners

Performance by club

See also 
 Ukrainian Men's Handball Super League

References

External links 
 Official website of the FHU
 Handball in Ukraine

Handball competitions in Ukraine
Women's handball leagues
Handball
Sports leagues established in 1992
1992 establishments in Ukraine
Women's handball in Ukraine
Handball leagues in Europe
Handball
Professional sports leagues in Ukraine